Larry Dee Wilcox (born August 8, 1947) is an American actor best known for his role as California Highway Patrol officer (later captain) Jonathan "Jon" Baker in the television series CHiPs, which ran from 1977 to 1983 on NBC. A Vietnam veteran, Wilcox races cars and is also a private pilot.

Early life
Wilcox was born on the 8th of August 1947 in San Diego, the son of Marion G. and John C. Wilcox. He and his three siblings were raised in Rawlins, Wyoming, by their single mother. He graduated from Rawlins High School, went to the University of Wyoming, then transferred to Los Angeles Pierce College. He eventually went to Cal State Northridge. He worked at different jobs including acting and rodeo cowboy.

Military service
Wilcox enlisted in the Marine Corps in May 1967 and served in Vietnam during the Tet Offensive. While in Vietnam he studied French and took general classes at College of the Desert during his final year in the Marines at Twentynine Palms, California. He was honorably discharged with the rank of Staff Sergeant in 1973.

Entertainment career

Early years
Wilcox made a guest appearance in 1971 in Room 222. In 1973, Wilcox appeared in The Streets of San Francisco episode "The Runaways" as older brother George. Also in 1973, he starred in Lassie as Dale, one of the boys who grew up there and was now working as a hired hand. Wilcox appeared in an episode of Cannon "Target In The Mirror"  in 1973 in a role as a witness. He performed in the 1976 film The Last Hard Men, and other TV appearances including The Partridge Family, Hawaii Five-O, M*A*S*H, Fantasy Island, and Police Story, as well as commercials. He was the main (and only human for most of it) actor of a two-part show on The Wonderful World of Disney anthology show in 1978 playing a lone cowboy on a cattle drive and his adventures en route to market. He also played Emmett Dalton in the 1979 film The Last Ride of the Dalton Gang.

CHiPs

Wilcox was cast as Jon Baker, one of the lead characters on CHiPs; he was not in season six and was cast from 1977 to 1982. Wilcox performed many of his own stunts on the show. Unlike his co-star Erik Estrada (who played his partner "Ponch"), Wilcox never sustained any major injuries. By the 1979–80 season, he made $25,000 per episode (the same amount as Estrada) and it escalated thereafter. During his time on CHiPs, Wilcox appeared on the cover of TV Guide three times, along with Estrada.

Rumors of friction between the two had occurred late in the 1978–79 season, but it calmed down after Estrada's injury at the beginning of the 1979–80 season as Wilcox came to his friend's rescue. Wilcox confirmed that some of the rumors of on-set feuding were true, but minor issues were blown out of proportion. He added: "We're just two totally different people."

Wilcox is among the cast members who appeared at a reunion in Los Angeles to celebrate the series' 35th anniversary. Wilcox filmed the event and helped raise money for police officers and for kids at risk. Wilcox stated he called Estrada to invite him, as did Robert Pine, but Estrada did not return calls nor did he show up for the event. Estrada's manager said he was trying to establish a new and separate identity from CHiPs.

After CHiPs
In 1982, Wilcox left CHiPs and formed his own production company, Wilcox Productions, which produced the award-winning TV series for HBO The Ray Bradbury Theater for five years. He developed, optioned, and sold to MGM The Yorkshire Ripper and sold to Columbia The Wolfman Jack Story. Later, Wilcox optioned Flipper and was the executive producer of that movie for Universal Pictures. He also continued acting and directing. Presently, Wilcox works with Saratoga Entertainment which is a production and digital distribution company. He also is a consultant to Enabledware, which is a rule-based digital distribution software in 57 languages with a focus on digital universities and security for sports stadiums.

Wilcox was executive producer of the TV movie Death of a Centerfold: The Dorothy Stratten Story. The story had a deeper resonance for Wilcox, whose older sister was fatally shot in front of her three children, her mother, and 17 witnesses. The accused murderer, her husband, was later acquitted in a celebrated trial in Wyoming and subsequently killed in a barroom brawl, according to Wilcox.

Wilcox appeared in a 1985 made-for-TV movie sequel to The Dirty Dozen, called The Dirty Dozen: Next Mission. He played convicted war prisoner Tommy Wells, recruited to help terminate a German general who is plotting to assassinate Hitler. Wilcox was reunited briefly on-screen with his former co-star Estrada in National Lampoon's Loaded Weapon 1, and then again in 1998, where he reprised his role of Jon Baker (now Captain Baker) in the Turner Network Television production of CHiPs '99. In 2008, Wilcox had a brief cameo in the music video for Rehab's song "Bartender Song (Sittin' at a Bar)" where he played a San Diego Police sergeant. 

Wilcox appeared in a cameo as himself dressed as Officer Jon Baker on the 2009 Christmas episode of 30 Rock. Wilcox also completed a cameo in the feature film Two Sillies. He made a brief appearance as mine owner Bob Freeman in the 2016 drama 94 Feet. He had a role on The Love Boat as Sergeant Belouski in his protection of a star witness on Season 4, Episode 1.

Personal life
Wilcox married his first wife, Judy Vagner, on March 29, 1969, while serving his last months of duty after returning from the Vietnam War. They had two children together, Derek and Heidi. His second marriage was to Dutch native, Hannie Strasser, a one-time CHiPs assistant sound technician. The wedding took place on April 11, 1980. Their daughter, Wendy, was born in 1982 and they divorced  after her birth. On March 22, 1986, Wilcox married Marlene Harmon, a member of the 1980 Olympic heptathlon team. They have two sons, Chad and Ryan.

Filmography
The Great American Beauty Contest (1973)
The Girl Most Likely To... (1973)
Death Stalk (1975)
Sky Heist (1975)
The Last Hard Men (1976)
Relentless (1977)
The Last Ride of the Dalton Gang (1979)
Deadly Lessons (1983)
The Dirty Dozen: Next Mission (1985)
Mission Manila (1990)
National Lampoon's Loaded Weapon 1 (1993)
The Thundering 8th (2000)
94 Feet (2016)
Wish Man (2019)

See also
List of members of the American Legion
List of people from San Diego
List of people from Wyoming
List of United States Marines

References

External links

 
 

1947 births
20th-century American male actors
21st-century American male actors
American aviators
American male film actors
American male television actors
United States Marine Corps personnel of the Vietnam War
California State University, Northridge alumni
CHiPs
Living people
Male actors from San Diego
Male actors from Wyoming
Military personnel from California
People from Rawlins, Wyoming
People from West Hills, Los Angeles
United States Marines